The 1990 European Grand Masters was a professional non-ranking snooker tournament that took place in December 1990 in Monte Carlo, Monaco.

Martin Clark won the tournament, defeating 58 year old Ray Reardon 4–2 in the final. This was Reardon's last appearance in a professional final.


Main draw

References

1990 in snooker
Sport in Monaco